Oakridge State Airport  is a public airport located 1 mile (1.6 km) west of Oakridge, in Lane County, Oregon, United States.

Runway
Oakridge Airport has one runway designated 9/27 with an asphalt surface measuring 3610 by 47 feet (1,100 x 14 m).

External links
City of Oakridge Airport website

Airports in Lane County, Oregon